NHL 2K10 is an ice hockey sports video game developed by Visual Concepts and published by 2K Sports, part of the NHL 2K series. It was released on September 15, 2009 for PlayStation 2, PlayStation 3, Wii, and Xbox 360. Randy Hahn and Drew Remenda provide commentary as they did for NHL 2K9. NHL 2K10 was the final 2K Sports ice hockey video game released for the PlayStation 2, PlayStation 3, and Xbox 360, as NHL 2K11 was released only for the iOS and Wii.

Cover athlete
Washington Capitals All-Star left winger Alexander Ovechkin was confirmed as the cover athlete of NHL 2K10. This was the third time Ovechkin had been a cover athlete, as he was featured on the cover of NHL 07 and on the Russian cover of NHL 09. He has now been featured on four, with NHL 21.

Reception

The Wii version received "generally favorable reviews", while the PlayStation 3 and Xbox 360 versions received "mixed or average reviews", according to the review aggregation website Metacritic.  In Japan, Famitsu where the PlayStation 3 and Xbox 360 were ported on October 15, 2009, gave these versions a score of all four sixes for a total of 24 out of 40.

References

External links

NHL 2K10 official website

2009 video games
2K Sports games
10
Ice hockey video games
PlayStation 2 games
PlayStation 3 games
Wii games
Wii MotionPlus games
Xbox 360 games
Wii Speak games
Cancelled Windows games
Video games developed in the United States
Video games set in 2009
Video games set in 2010